The East Coast Junior Lacrosse League is a Junior-level Canadian box lacrosse league. The teams are located in Nova Scotia and New Brunswick. The champions of the East Coast league have in the past moved on to represent Team Nova Scotia at the Founders Cup, the Canadian National Junior B championship. The league has produced some notable players, including players in the National Lacrosse League (NLL) NCAA Division II, Division III, CUFLA and Ontario Junior A and B leagues.

History
Formed in 2004, the league featured five original teams (Dartmouth Bandits, Halifax Northwest Rebels, Halifax Southwest Hurricanes, Moncton Mavericks, Sackville Wolves). 

A second-tier league was added in 2012 with Eastern Shore Breakers, St. Margaret's Bay Storm and Truro Bearcats competing against "B" teams from Halifax Northwest, Moncton and Sackville. This lasted just two years as St. Margaret's folded after one season and Sackville "B" failed to finish their 2013 season.

Just four teams competed in 2014 with Moncton Mavericks going on hiatus for the season. Halifax Northwest re-branded as Northwest Marley Lions.

The Mavericks returned in 2015 along with a new team, the Truro-based Mi'kmaq Warriors, increasing the league to six teams.

For the 2016 season the Mavericks changed their name from Moncton to New Brunswick Mavericks.

The 2018 season saw the Halifax Northwest Marley Lions withdraw from play and a disbursal draft spread their players throughout the remaining teams on a one-year release. The ECJLL operated as a five team league for the duration of the season.

Prior to the 2019 season, Halifax Northwest moved its franchise to St. Margaret's Bay and re-branded once again as the Rebels. Previously disbursed players were re-called and the St. Margaret's Bay Rebels made their debut at the start of 2019, restoring the league to six teams. The 2020 season was cancelled due to the Covid-19 pandemic.

The league completed a shortened 2021 season with 5 teams, as the New Brunswick Mavericks were unable to compete due to Covid-19 restrictions. The Dartmouth Bandits won their 5th consecutive Garnet Knight Cup (and 7th title overall), becoming the winningest franchise in ECJLL history.

Teams

Former teams 
 Suburban Storm (2006-2008)
 Halifax Northwest Rebels (2004-2013)
 Halifax Northwest Marley Lions (2014-2017)
 Moncton Mavericks (2009-2013, 2015)
 New Brunswick Mavericks (2016-2019)

Garnet Knight Cup Champions

Notable Players / Alumni
The ECJLL has evolved into a highly competitive and skilled lacrosse league producing talented players and coaches who have gone on to continue their lacrosse careers at the NCAA, national and professional levels. Notable players/alumni include:

 Alex Pace (Philadelphia Wings)
 Jordan McKenna (Toronto Rock)
 Chet Koneczny (Halifax, Philadelphia, Orlando, Washington, Colorado)
 Liam McGrath (Lenoir-Rhyne University)
 Zach Watson (St. Michaels) 
Zac Carrigan (Mars Hill University) 
Adam Gallop (Emmanuel College)
Luke Parker (Briarcliffe College)
 Brian Huyghue (Limestone College & Team Canada)
 Jake Mosher-McGraw (Tampa University)
 Alex Bechard (St. Lawrence University)
Luke Smeltzer (RIT)
Jeremy Vautour (St. Lawrence University)
 Jamie Dunbar (New England College)
 Matt Dunbar (Guilford College)
 Breton Penney (Lynchburg College)
 Ian McShane  (Victoria Shamrocks)

References

External links
East Coast Junior Lacrosse League

Lacrosse leagues in Canada